Doliops multifasciata is a species of beetle in the family Cerambycidae. It was described by Schultze in 1922.

References

Doliops
Beetles described in 1922